Cossack songs are folk songs which were created by Cossacks.

Dnipropetrovsk region, Ukraine

Dnipropetrovsk Cossack songs (Ukrainian:Козацькі пісні Дніпропетровщини), the Zaporozhian Cossacks songs of the Dnipropetrovsk region, are listed as an intangible cultural heritage in need of urgent protection. Cossack songs traditionally involve male singing. Cossack songs are nowadays often performed by women, but rarely in mixed groups. UNESCO's list mentions the choral groups Krynytsia, Bohuslavochka, and Pershotsvit.

List of Intangible Cultural Heritage 
2014 in Dnipropetrovsk region began the initiative group of nomination dossier for inclusion of Cossack songs into the UNESCO Intangible Heritage List. On November 28, 2016, the Committee for the Protection of Intangible Cultural Heritage List included Cossack songs of the Dnipropetrovsk region on the List of Intangible Cultural Heritage in need of urgent protection. According to the committee, these works, sung by Cossack communities in the region, talk about the tragedy of war and the personal experiences of soldiers. The lyrics maintain spiritual ties with the past, but are also entertaining.

Research 
The first transcribed complex of Cossack songs was published in 1997 by bandura player, Victor Kyrylenko. In the early 2000s, expeditions into the Dnipropetrovsk region to transcribe more of these folk songs were conducted by Dnipropetrovsk National University staff.

See also 

 Cossacks

References

External links 
 Cossack’s songs of Dnipropetrovsk Region

Russian music
Masterpieces of the Oral and Intangible Heritage of Humanity
Ukrainian art
Intangible Cultural Heritage in Need of Urgent Safeguarding